The Oratory of Saint Cénéré (French for Oratoire de Saint-Céneré) is an oratory in the village of Saulges, in the municipality of Saulges in the Mayenne department, France.

History
The oratory takes its name from Saint Céneré (or Cerenico), a Benedictine monk born in Spoleto in the 7th century; he was sent by Pope Martin I to preach in Merovingian Gaul with his brother, Serenicus, and with him he arrived in the diocese of Le Mans, in Saulges, around 649–650.

The cave served as a hermitage for the monk. The chapel is located where Céneré is said to have caused a spring to issue from the rock. The oratory was rebuilt in stone in 1849 by the Marquis de la Rochelambert, who owned the land, with the assistance of the Saulges factory. The factory became the owner in 1860 when Montguyon was sold to Adrien Rousseau of Montfrand. The grotto was outfitted in 1903 and the east building was added in 1933.

Architecture 
Access to the oratory is facilitated by two stairways leaning against the hill; the nave that extends the chapel is covered by a roof terrace. They were made by the Carmel workshop in Le Mans.

In the cave below, the 18th-century statue of Saint Cénéré in polychrome wood, restored in 2005, surmounts the spring described by Grosse Dupéron. This continuous stream of water has given Saint Cèneré the nickname "the saint who pees" or "the little pissing saint."

Gallery

References

Further reading

External links

Churches in Mayenne
Roman Catholic churches in France
Churches completed in 1933